São Borja Airport , also known as São Borja João Manoel Airport, is the airport serving São Borja, located in the Rio Grande do Sul state of Brazil.

Airlines and destinations

No scheduled flights operate at this airport.

Accidents and incidents
30 June 1950: a SAVAG Lockheed Model 18 Lodestar registration PP-SAA flying from Porto Alegre to São Borja in bad weather collided against a hill, caught fire and crashed near the location of São Francisco de Assis. All 10 occupants died, including the founder of SAVAG and pilot, Gustavo Kraemer, and Joaquim Pedro Salgado Filho, senator and first Minister of Air Force in Brazil.

Access

See also

List of airports in Brazil

References

External links

Airports in Rio Grande do Sul